Thaddeus D. Moffitt (born September 12, 2000) is an American professional stock car racing driver. He last competed part-time in the NASCAR Camping World Truck Series, driving the No. 43 Chevrolet Silverado for Reaume Brothers Racing and the No. 20 Silverado for Young's Motorsports and part-time in the ARCA Menards Series, driving the No. 44 Chevrolet SS for Ferrier-McClure Racing.

Racing career

Early career
Growing up in a racing family, Moffitt cut his teeth in go-karts at age fourteen and later moved up to quarter midgets and limited late models, running at tracks like Caraway Speedway and Ace Speedway. Speaking about having racers in the family, he said that advice will be given upon request but also that older relatives wanted him to develop without help. Moffitt was the 2016 Southeast Limited Late Model champion, and won his first late model race earlier that year.

ARCA Menards Series

Moffitt made his ARCA Racing Series debut in April 2017 at Fairgrounds Speedway, driving a car reminiscent of one driven by his grandfather Richard Petty, for Empire Racing, a satellite team of Richard Petty Motorsports. He ran three races in 2017. Moffitt's best finish was eleventh, at Lucas Oil Raceway.

In early 2018, Moffitt tested at Daytona International Speedway and announced races at Fairgrounds Speedway, Pocono Raceway and Lucas Oil with the potential for more races to be added later in the year. In his second start of the year, at Salem Speedway, Moffitt was involved in two incidents, one with Natalie Decker and one with Jack Dossey III. Moffitt rebounded from a mid-race spin in his next race to claim his first top ten, finishing tenth in the race at Toledo.

On January 9, 2020, it was announced that Moffitt would join DGR-Crosley for the season-opening race at Daytona, and would then run all races on the schedule until sponsorship dried up, plus Memphis, which the team had previously signed a sponsor for. He claimed three top five finishes over thirteen races, with a career-best finish of fourth at Memphis.

In January 2021, it was announced that Moffitt would return to ARCA with the renamed David Gilliland Racing team for at least eleven races that year. He proceeded to compete in almost the entire season, only being replaced by Taylor Gray for the dirt races and Canadian J. P. Bergeron for the final two events. At Michigan, Moffitt was involved in controversy after his retaliation attempt against Drew Dollar for a previous wreck resulted in a crash which injured Tim Richmond.

NASCAR Truck Series
On February 10, 2022, it was announced that Moffitt will make his Camping World Truck Series debut at Daytona for Reaume Brothers Racing in collaboration with GMS Racing, running a paint scheme that pays tribute to Richard Petty's 1992 retirement season.

Personal life
Moffitt was born on September 12, 2000, to Brian Moffitt and Rebecca Petty-Moffitt in Trinity, North Carolina. His mother, Rebecca, is the youngest daughter of NASCAR Hall of Fame driver Richard Petty. Throughout his childhood, Moffitt played football and other organized sports. In his mid-teens, Moffitt began competing in Kart racing before moving to Late model racing in 2016. Moffitt had attended Wheatmore High School before deciding to switch to online schooling midway through his high school career.

In 2019, Moffitt traveled to England to run a 1981 edition of grandfather Richard Petty's racecar at the Goodwood Festival of Speed.

Despite sharing the same last name, he is not related to fellow NASCAR competitor Brett Moffitt.

Motorsports career results

NASCAR
(key) (Bold – Pole position awarded by qualifying time. Italics – Pole position earned by points standings or practice time. * – Most laps led.)

Camping World Truck Series

ARCA Menards Series
(key) (Bold – Pole position awarded by qualifying time. Italics – Pole position earned by points standings or practice time. * – Most laps led.)

ARCA Menards Series East

ARCA Menards Series West

 Season still in progress

References

External links
 
 

Living people
2000 births
ARCA Menards Series drivers
Racing drivers from North Carolina
People from Asheboro, North Carolina
Petty family